Ndassima is a gold mine in Ouaka preferecture in Central African Republic.

History 
From 2006 until 2012 it was owned by Canadian company AXMIN Inc. On 22 December 2012 Seleka rebels took control of Ndassima. In June 2013, heavy rains provoked the collapse of a gold mine in Ndassima, killing 37 miners and injuring many others. On 22 August a mine collapsed again killing at least 25 people. In 2018 it was reported that FPRC and UPC armed groups share control over the Ndassima gold mining site In 2019 AXMIN Inc. the mining license to operate the Ndassima mine came into dispute. The region remains in a state of Force Majeure at this time with legal ownership to be established through legal process. In 2020 it was reported that Russian mercenaries were present at Ndassima gold mine and helping rebels manage it, but this is disputed. On 10 February 2021 government forces recaptured Ndassima after nine years. Two days later UPC launched an attack on Ndassima which was repelled by army forces with help from Russian mercenaries. Legal ownership of the asset remains in dispute and Axmin still holds the mining convention pending resolution at law.

See also 
 Mining industry of the Central African Republic

References

Gold mines
Mining in the Central African Republic
Populated places in Ouaka